Serratella is a genus of spiny crawler mayflies in the family Ephemerellidae. There are at least 20 described species in Serratella.

Species
These 20 species belong to the genus Serratella:

 Serratella albai Gonzalez Del Tanago & Garcia De Jalon, 1983
 Serratella brevicauda Jacobus, Zhou & McCafferty, 2009
 Serratella elissa Jacobus, Zhou & McCafferty, 2009
 Serratella frisoni (McDunnough, 1927)
 Serratella fusongensis (Su & You, 1988)
 Serratella ignita (Poda, 1761)
 Serratella ishiwatai (Gose, 1985)
 Serratella karia (Kazanci, 1990)
 Serratella lactata (Bengtsson, 1909)
 Serratella levis (Day, 1954)
 Serratella longipennis Zhou, Gui & Su, 1997
 Serratella micheneri (Traver, 1934)
 Serratella occiprens Jacobus & McCafferty, 2008
 Serratella serrata (Morgan, 1911)
 Serratella serratoides (McDunnough, 1931)
 Serratella setigera (Bajkova, 1967)
 Serratella spinosa (Ikonomov, 1961)
 Serratella tsuno Jacobus & McCafferty, 2008
 Serratella uenoi (Allen & Edmunds, 1963)
 Serratella zapekinae (Bajkova, 1967)

References

Further reading

External links

 

Mayflies
Articles created by Qbugbot